Catocala separans is a moth of the family Erebidae. It is found in Russia (Primorye), Korea and Japan (Honshu, Tsushima).

The wingspan is about 57 mm.

References

External links
Catocala of Asia

separans
Moths of Asia
Moths of Korea
Moths of Japan
Moths described in 1889